Christos Gromitsaris (born 10 February 1991) is a Greek professional footballer who plays as a centre back for Super League 2 club Niki Volos.

Career
Gromitsaris began his football career with local amateur club Elpides Agrinio, before being acquired by Athenian club Atromitos at the age of 17. Gromitsaris was promoted to the men's team two years later, and was consecutively loaned out to Gamma Ethniki clubs Agia Paraskevi, P.A.O. Rouf and Apollon Smyrni to receive substantial playing time. He then made his debut in the Football League with Vyzas Megara, still on loan from Atromitos, recording a total of 41 appearances, almost exclusively as a starter. He would however not get any playing time upon his return to the Peristeri-based club in the 2013–14 season, and therefore in January 2014, Gromitsaris moved to Gamma Ethniki side Ionikos on a free transfer. Six months later, Gromitsaris signed a contract with Football League side Fostiras. After recording 26 appearances for the Tavros-based club, Gromitsaris signed a 1-year contract with the ex-Superleague club Ergotelis. He reportedly terminated his contract with the club on 30 December 2015, having made a total of 13 appearances and scoring 1 goal. On 7 January 2016, Gromitsaris signed a 2,5-year contract with fellow Football League side Kerkyra.

References

External links

1991 births
Living people
Footballers from Agrinio
Greek footballers
Super League Greece players
Gamma Ethniki players
Football League (Greece) players
Super League Greece 2 players
Atromitos F.C. players
Agia Paraskevi F.C. players
Rouf F.C. players
Apollon Smyrnis F.C. players
Vyzas F.C. players
Fostiras F.C. players
Ionikos F.C. players
Ergotelis F.C. players
PAE Kerkyra players
Athlitiki Enosi Larissa F.C. players
AO Chania F.C. players
Niki Volos F.C. players
Association football central defenders